

Užava Lighthouse (Latvian: Užavas bāka) - a lighthouse located on the Latvian coast of the Baltic Sea. The lighthouse stands in an isolated location, on a 28 metres high sand dune, which is permanently threatened by the Baltic Sea waves' erosion. For this reason, the first coastal reinforcement – a dense log wall was constructed to secure the lighthouse's location in 1910. Later, fir-tree baskets filled with gravel, and big boulders to absorb the waves' energy. Currently, the base of the lighthouse is protected by rock armour.

History 
The original tower of the Užava lighthouse was destroyed by artillery shells during World War I. The present-day lighthouse tower is 19 metres in height, completed in 1925. The inscription of the year 1924 on the nearby weather vane on the lightower's dome roof marks the beginning of construction works of the lighthouse.

See also

 List of lighthouses in Latvia

References

Lighthouses completed in 1930
Resort architecture in Latvia
Lighthouses in Latvia